Oz: Into the Wild is an original novel based on the U.S. television series Buffy the Vampire Slayer. It mainly features the character "Oz", other known television characters play minor roles.

Plot summary

Determined to find a solution to his lycanthropic problem, Oz sets out to discover the beast within himself, as well as the rest of the world. His journey takes him to LA, Fiji, Australia, China and finally to Tibet in his quest for peace. Oz finds himself running from Gib Cain, the werewolf hunter who wants his skin, battling vampires and all around, just running for his life. His journey takes him to China where he meets a young woman named Jinan, who is something more than human, and the two of them travel to Tibet in search of answers. A monk can guide Oz through his journey, but he can only take him so far into his own self-discovery. During the meantime, Muztag, an evil demon who has been the monk's lifelong enemy, is gathering forces in an attempt to take over a particular valley in Tibet and he must be stopped before he kills the monk, or Oz's hopes for hiding the beast within him will be totally lost.

Continuity
Supposed to be set after "Wild at Heart". Oz leaves Sunnydale to find himself and understand the wolf.

Canonical issues

Buffy books such as this one are not usually considered by fans as canonical. Some fans consider them stories from the imaginations of authors and artists, while other fans consider them as taking place in an alternative fictional reality. However unlike fan fiction, overviews summarising their story, written early in the writing process, were 'approved' by both Fox and Joss Whedon (or his office), and the books were therefore later published as officially Buffy/Angel merchandise.

External links

Reviews
Litefoot1969.bravepages.com - Review of this book by Litefoot
Nika-summers.com - Review of this book by Nika Summers

2002 American novels
Books based on Buffy the Vampire Slayer
Werewolf novels
Novels set in Tibet